Thiago Rosa da Conceição (born 18 March 2002), commonly known as Thiago Rosa, is a Brazilian professional footballer who plays as a left-back for Avaí, on loan from Grêmio.

Club career

Grêmio
Born in Capão da Canoa, Brazil, Thiago Rosa joined the Grêmio's Academy at the age of 9 in 2011.

Career statistics

Club

Honours
Grêmio
Campeonato Gaúcho: 2022
Recopa Gaúcha: 2022

References

External links

Profile at the Grêmio F.B.P.A. website

2002 births
Living people
Brazilian footballers
Association football defenders
Campeonato Brasileiro Série A players
Grêmio Foot-Ball Porto Alegrense players
Esporte Clube Pelotas players
Avaí FC players